Kathy Jordan and Paula Smith were the defending champions but lost in the final 6–4, 4–6, 6–2 against Barbara Potter and Sharon Walsh.

Seeds
Champion seeds are indicated in bold text while text in italics indicates the round in which those seeds were eliminated.

Draw

Final

Top half

Bottom half

External links
 1983 Murjani Cup Doubles Draw

Doubles